Kayse Jama is an American politician currently serving as a Democratic member of the Oregon State Senate, representing Oregon's 24th Senate district, which includes parts of Clackamas and Multnomah Counties. Jama was appointed by the Clackamas and Multnomah County Board of Commissioners to replace Shemia Fagan, who was elected Oregon Secretary of State in 2021.

Early life and education 
Kayse Jama was born into a nomadic family in Somalia. At eight years old, he moved to the capital, Mogadishu, to begin his education. Jama graduated from high school just as the civil war erupted, and he lived as a refugee for several years before arriving in San Diego in 1998. He settled in Portland, Oregon, shortly thereafter. He staffed the front desk at the Portland DoubleTree Hotel and helped other newly arrived refugees adapt to life in the United States as a case manager at Lutheran Community Services Northwest, eventually receiving a bachelor's degree in sociology from Marylhurst University.

Career 

In 2021, Jama stepped down as Executive Director of Unite Oregon after being appointed to the Oregon State Senate. He replaced State Senator Shemia Fagan, who was appointed to serve as Oregon Secretary of State. Jama represents Senate District 24 which comprises East Portland and North Clackamas. He is the first Muslim to serve in the Oregon State Legislature and the first former refugee to serve in the Oregon State Senate.

From 2005 to 2007, he trained immigrant and refugee community leaders in five Western states — Oregon, Washington, Nevada, Utah and Idaho — under a New Voices Fellowship at the Western States Center.

Unite Oregon
In 2002, Kayse Jama co-founded the Center for Intercultural Organizing, now Unite Oregon, after witnessing racial incidents in Portland following the September 11 attacks in 2001. Jama served as the director of the statewide nonprofit organization until 2021.

While at Unite Oregon, Jama led community organizing and ballot measure campaigns to reduce the influence of money in politics, end police profiling, reform Oregon's hate crime laws, and expand drug treatment. Jama has also been a founding member of several coalitions in Oregon, including Fair Shot for All and the Oregon Health Equity Alliance.

Oregon State Senate
Jama is the chair of the Senate Committee On Housing and Development, and he serves on the Senate Committee On Labor and Business, and the Joint Committee On Ways and Means Subcommittee On Transportation and Economic Development.

Jama believes in "co-integration," meaning immigrants should integrate into their new communities at the same time as pre-existing communities integrate with other cultures. "It's a two-way street."

Awards 
Jama has been awarded the Skidmore Prize for outstanding young nonprofit professionals (2007), the Oregon Immigrant Achievement Award from Oregon chapter of the American Immigration Lawyers Association (2008), the Lowenstein Trust Award, presented yearly to “that person who demonstrated the greatest contribution to assisting the poor and underprivileged in Portland" (2009), the Portland Peace Prize (2012), the Rankin Award in recognition of "lifelong activism and extraordinary service" (2016), the Northwest Workers’ Justice Project's Tribune of Worker Justice Award "celebrating his dedication to uplifting the lives of Oregon immigrant and low-wage workers" (2017), and a Rockwood Leadership Institute's Strengthening Democracy Fellowship (2019).

Personal life 
In 2004, Jama married Stephanie D. Stephens, who serves on the David Douglas School Board in Portland, Oregon. Their twins, Sahan and Saharla, were born in 2010.

References 

Democratic Party Oregon state senators
Politicians from Portland, Oregon
Living people
Year of birth missing (living people)
American politicians of Somalian descent
Somalian emigrants to the United States
African-American state legislators in Oregon